Tooele County School District is a school district headquartered in Tooele, Utah.

Its boundary is exactly that of Tooele County.

History

The district previously allowed students residing in other school districts to attend Tooele County schools without needing prior permission, and it also allowed students who lived in Utah with other families but whose parents lived outside of Utah to attend Tooele County schools for free. In 1983 the Tooele district began requiring students in the former category to get permission from district officials before enrolling, and it began requiring the latter to pay tuition fees. Sponsored international students were still permitted to attend for free.

In 1997 the board of trustees, which had formerly proposed a bond of $25 million, increased the proposal to $40-45 million because they argued that the student body had significantly increased in high schools, and plans were drawn up to build a new high school in Stansbury Park.

In 2022, Mark Ernst became the superintendent.

Schools
 K-12
 Dugway Schools

 Junior and senior high schools
 Wendover High School

 High schools
 Grantsville High School
 Stansbury High School
 Tooele High School

 Junior high schools
 Grantsville Junior High School
 Clarke N. Johnsen Junior High School
 Tooele Junior High School

 Elementary schools
 Copper Canyon
 Grantsville
 Ibapah
 Middle Canyon
 Northlake
 Old Mill
 Overlake
 Rose Springs
 Settlement Canyon
 Anna Smith
 Stansbury Park
 Sterling
 Twenty Wells
 Vernon
 West
 Willow

Alternative:
 Blue Peak High School

References

External links
 Tooele County School District
Education in Tooele County, Utah
School districts in Utah